A carburetor (also spelled carburettor or carburetter) is a device used by an internal combustion engine to control and mix air and fuel entering the engine. The primary method of adding fuel to the intake air is through the Venturi tube in the main metering circuit, though various other components are also used to provide extra fuel or air in specific circumstances.

Since the 1990s, carburetors have been largely replaced by fuel injection for cars and trucks, but carburetors are still used by some small engines (e.g. lawnmowers, generators and concrete mixers) and motorcycles. Diesel engines have always used fuel injection instead of carburetors.

Etymology
The name "carburetor" is derived from the verb carburet, which means "to combine with carbon", or, in particular, "to enrich a gas by combining it with carbon or hydrocarbons". Thus a carburetor mixes intake air with hydrocarbon-based fuel, such as petrol or AutoGas (LPG).

The name is spelled "carburetor" in American English and "carburettor" in British English. Colloquial abbreviations include carb in the UK and North America or Carby in Australia.

Operating principle 

The carburetor is located upstream of the inlet manifold. Air from the atmosphere enters the carburetor (usually via an air cleaner), has fuel added within the carburetor, passes through the inlet valve(s) and then enters the combustion chamber. Most engines use a single carburetor shared between all of the cylinders, though some high-performance engines have used multiple carburetors.

The carburetor works on Bernoulli's principle: the static pressure of the intake air reduces at higher speeds, drawing more fuel into the airstream. In most cases (except for the accelerator pump), the driver pressing the throttle pedal does not directly increase the fuel entering the engine. Instead, the airflow through the carburetor increases, which in turn increases the amount of fuel drawn into the intake mixture.

The main disadvantage of basing a carburetor's operation on Bernoulli's Principle is that being a fluid dynamic device, the pressure reduction in a venturi tends to be proportional to the square of the intake airspeed. The fuel jets are much smaller and fuel flow is limited mainly by the fuel's viscosity so that the fuel flow tends to be proportional to the pressure difference. So jets sized for full power tend to starve the engine at lower speed and part throttle. Most commonly this has been corrected by using multiple jets. In SU and other variable jet carburetors, it was corrected by varying the jet size.

The orientation of the carburetor is a key design consideration. Older engines used updraft carburetors, where the air enters from below the carburetor and exits through the top. From the late 1930s, downdraft carburetors become more commonly used (especially in the United States), along with side draft carburetors (especially in Europe).

Fuel circuits

Main metering circuit
The main metering circuit consists of a pipe which temporarily narrows, forming a venturi. Fuel is introduced into the air stream through small holes (the main jets) at the narrowest part of the venturi, where the air is at its highest speed.

Downstream of the venturi is a throttle (usually in the form of a butterfly valve) which is used to control the amount of air entering the carburetor. In a car, this throttle is connected to the vehicle's throttle pedal, which (along with the brakes) is the driver's main method of controlling the car's speed.

At greater throttle openings, the speed of air passing through the venturi increases, which lowers the pressure of the air and draws more fuel into the airstream. At the same time, the reduced manifold vacuum results in less fuel flow through the idle and off-idle circuits.

At lesser throttle openings, the air speed through the venturi is insufficient to maintain the fuel flow, therefore the fuel is instead supplied by the carburetor's idle and off-idle circuits.

Choke 
During cold starts, fuel vaporizes less readily and tends to condense on the walls of the intake manifold, starving the cylinders of fuel and making the engine difficult to start, thus additional fuel is required (for a given amount of air) to start and run the engine until it warms up. 

A choke is used to supply this extra fuel. While the engine is warming up, a partially closed choke restricts the flow of air at the entrance to the carburetor, which increases the vacuum in the main metering circuit, causing more fuel to be supplied to the engine via the main jets. In older cars, the choke was manually operated by the driver, often using a lever or knob on the dashboard. Automatic chokes became more commonplace from the late 1950s, whereby a bimetallic thermostat was used to automatically close and open the choke based on the temperature of the engine's coolant liquid, an electrical resistance heater or air drawn through a tube connected to an engine exhaust source.  A choke closed after the engine has warmed up increases the engine's fuel consumption and exhaust gas emissions and causes the engine to run rough and lack power.

However, excessive fuel (called a flooded engine) can prevent an engine from starting. To remove the excess fuel, many carburetors include an 'unloader mechanism', whereby the choke is held open to allow extra air into the engine in order to clear out the excess fuel. In order to activate the unloader mechanism, the driver holds the throttle pedal fully open while cranking the engine.

Another method used by carburetors to improve the operation of a cold engine is a fast idle cam. This cam is connected to the choke and prevents the throttle from closing fully while the choke is in operation. The resulting increase in idle speed provides a more stable idle for a cold engine (by better atomizing the cold fuel) and helps the engine warm up quicker.

Idle circuit

Off-idle circuit
Many carburetors use an off-idle circuit, which includes an additional fuel jet which is briefly used as the throttle starts to open. This jet is located in a low-pressure area behind the throttle. The additional fuel it provides is used to compensate for the reduced vacuum that occurs when the throttle is opened, thus smoothing the transition from the idle circuit to the main metering circuit.

Power valve
In a four-stroke engine, often it is desirable to provide extra fuel to the engine at high loads (to increase the power output and reduce engine knocking). A 'power valve', which is a spring-loaded valve that is held shut by engine vacuum, is often used to provide this extra fuel. As the airflow through the carburetor increases, the reduced manifold vacuum pulls the power valve open, allowing more fuel into the main metering circuit.

In a two-stroke engine, the power valve operates in the opposite manner: in most circumstances the valve allows extra fuel into the engine, then at a certain engine speed (RPM) it closes to reduce the fuel entering the engine. This is done in order to extend the engine's maximum RPM, since many two-stroke engines can temporarily achieve higher RPM with a leaner air-fuel ratio.

Metering rod / step-up rod 
A 'metering rod' or 'step-up rod' system is sometimes used as an alternative to a power valve in a four-stroke engine, in order to supply extra fuel at high loads. One end of the rods is tapered, which sits in the main metering jets and acts as a valve for fuel flow in the jets. At high engine loads, the rods are lifted away from the jets (either mechanically or using manifold vacuum), increasing the volume of fuel can flow through the jet. In this manner, the amount of fuel delivered is tailored to the transient demands of the engine. These systems have been used by the Rochester Quadra jet and in the 1950s Carter Carburetor models.

Accelerator pump
The main metering circuit can adequately supply fuel to the engine in steady-state conditions, though there is a temporary shortfall as the throttle is opened. This is due to the inertia of the fuel being higher than that of air, and a reduction in fuel evaporation due to the reduced manifold vacuum. Therefore, an 'accelerator pump' is often used to briefly provide extra fuel as the throttle is opened. When the driver presses the throttle pedal, the accelerator pump (a small piston pump or a diaphragm pump) directly pumps extra fuel into the carburetor throat.

The accelerator pump can also be used to "prime" an engine with extra fuel prior to assist with a cold start.

Fuel supply

Float chamber

Carburetors include a reservoir of fuel, called a 'float chamber' or 'float bowl'. Fuel is supplied into the float chamber by a fuel pump. It is important to maintain a constant level of fuel within the float chamber, therefore a floating inlet valve regulates the fuel entering the float chamber (similar to a toilet cistern). Unlike in a fuel injected engine, the fuel system in a carbureted engine is not pressurized. For engines where the intake air travelling through the carburetor is pressurized (such as where the carburetor is downstream of a supercharger) the entire carburetor must be contained in an airtight pressurized box to operate. However, this is not necessary where the carburetor is upstream of the supercharger.

Problems of fuel boiling and vapor lock can occur in carbureted engines, especially in hotter climates. Since the float chamber is located close to the engine, heat from the engine (including for several hours after the engine is shut off) can cause the fuel to heat up to the point of vaporization. This causes air bubbles in the fuel (similar to the air bubbles that necessitate brake bleeding), which prevents the flow of fuel and is known as 'vapor lock'.

To avoid pressurizing the float chamber, vent tubes allow air to enter and exit the float chamber. These tubes usually extend into the carburetor throat, and placement of these vent tubes is critical to prevent fuel from sloshing out of them into the carburetor.

Diaphragm chamber
If the engine must be operated when the carburetor is not in an upright orientation (for example a chainsaw or airplane), a float chamber is not suitable, since fuel would leak out of it due to gravity. In these situations, a 'diaphragm chamber' is often used instead. This consists of a flexible diaphragm on one side of the fuel chamber, connected to a needle valve which regulates the fuel entering the chamber. As the volume of fuel in the chamber reduces, the diaphragm moves inward, which opens the needle valve to admit more fuel. As the fuel volume in the chamber approaches the correct amount, the diaphragm moves outwards, which causes the valve to reduce the amount of fuel entering the chamber. A balanced state is reached which creates a steady fuel reservoir level, which remains constant in any orientation.

Other components 

Other components that have been used by carburetors include:
 Air bleeds allowing air into various portions of the fuel passages, to enhance fuel delivery and vaporization. 
 Fuel flow restrictors in aircraft engines, to prevent fuel starvation during inverted flight.
 Heated vaporizers to assist with the atomization of the fuel, particularly for engines using kerosene, tractor vaporizing oil or in petrol-paraffin engines
 Early fuel evaporators
 Feedback carburetors, which adjusted the fuel/air mixture in response to signals from an oxygen sensor, in order to allow a catalytic converter to be used
 Constant vacuum carburetors (also called 'variable choke carburetors'), whereby the throttle cable is connected directly to the throttle cable plate. Pulling the cord caused raw gasoline to enter the carburetor, creating a large emission of hydrocarbons.
 Constant Velocity carburetors use a variable throttle closure in the intake air stream before the accelerator pedal operated the throttle plate. This variable closure is controlled by intake manifold pressure/vacuum. This pressure-controlled throttle provides relatively even intake pressure throughout the engine's speed and load ranges.

2-barrel and 4-barrel designs 

The basic design for a carburetor consists of a single venturi (main metering circuit), though designs with two or four venturi (2-barrel and 4-barrel carburetors respectively) are also quite commonplace. Typically the barrels consist of "primary" barrel(s) used for lower load situations and secondary barrel(s) activating when required to provide additional air/fuel at higher loads. The primary and secondary venturi are often sized differently and incorporate different features to suit the situations in which they are used.

Many 4-barrel carburetors use two primary and two secondary barrels. A 4-barrel design of two primary and two secondary barrels was commonly used in V8 engines.

The use of multiple carburetors (e.g. a carburetor for each cylinder or pair of cylinders) also results in the intake air being drawn through multiple venturi. Some engines have used multiple 2-barrel or 4-barrel carburetors, for example two 4-barrel carburetors have been used on several high-performance American V8 engines.

History 

In 1826, American engineer Samuel Morey received a patent for a "gas or vapor engine" which used a heated-surface carburetor to mix the turpentine fuel with air, but the design did not reach production. In 1875, German engineer Siegfried Marcus produced a car powered by the first petrol engine to use a carburetor (along with the first magneto ignition system). Karl Benz's Benz Patent-Motorwagen, built in 1885, also used a carburetor. 

The aforementioned carburetors were all "surface carburetors", which operate moving air across the top of a vessel containing the fuel. However, the 1885 Grandfather Clock engine created by German engineers Wilhelm Maybach and Gottlieb Daimler introduced the float-fed carburetor design, which used an atomizer nozzle. The Butler Petrol Cycle car - built in England in 1888 - also used a float-fed carburetor.

The first carburetor for a stationary engine was patented in 1893 by Hungarian engineers János Csonka and Donát Bánki.

The first 4-barrel carburetors were the Carter Carburetor WCFB and identical Rochester 4GC introduced in various General Motors models for 1952. Oldsmobile referred the new carburetor as the “Quadri-Jet” (original spelling) while Buick called it the “Airpower”.

In the United States, carburetors were the common method of fuel delivery for most US-made gasoline (petrol) engines until the late 1980s, when fuel injection became the preferred method. One of the last motorsport users of carburetors was NASCAR, which switched to electronic fuel injection after the 2011 Sprint Cup series.

In Europe, carburetors were largely replaced by fuel injection in the late 1980s, although fuel injection had been increasingly used in luxury cars and sports cars since the 1970s. EEC legislation required all vehicles sold and produced in member countries to have a catalytic converter after December 1992. This legislation had been in the pipeline for some time, with many cars becoming available with catalytic converters or fuel injection from around 1990.

Icing in aircraft engine carburetors 
A significant concern for aircraft engines is the formation of ice inside the carburetor. The temperature of air within the carburetor can by reduced by up to 40°C (72°F),  due to a combination of the reduced air pressure in the venturi and the latent heat of the evaporating fuel. The conditions during the descent to landing are particularly conducive to icing, since the engine is run at idle for a prolonged period with the throttle closed. Icing can also occur in cruise conditions at altitude.

A 'carb heat' system is often used to prevent icing. This system consists of a secondary air intake which passes around the exhaust, in order to heat the air before it enters the carburetor. Typically, the system is operated by the pilot manually switching the intake air to travel via the heated intake path as required. The carb heat system reduces the power output (due to the lower density of heated air) and causes the intake air filter to be bypassed, therefore the system is only used when there is a risk of icing.

If the engine is operating at idle RPM, another method to prevent icing is to periodically open the throttle, which increases the air temperature within the carburetor.

Carburetor icing also occurs on other applications and various methods have been employed to solve this problem.  On inline engines the intake and exhaust manifolds are on the same side of the head. Heat from the exhaust is used to warm the intake manifold and in turn the carburetor.  On V configurations exhaust gases were directed from one head through the intake cross over to the other head. One method for regulating the exhaust flow on the cross over for intake warming was a weighted eccentric butterfly valve called a heat riser that remained closed at idle and opened at higher exhaust flow.  Some vehicles used a heat stove around the exhaust manifold.  It as connected to the air filter intake via tubing and supplied warmed air to the air filter.  A vacuum controlled butterfly valve pre heat tube on the intake horn of the air cleaner would open allowing cooler air when engine load increased.

See also

Bernoulli's principle
Fuel injection
Humidifier
List of carburetor manufacturers
Venturi effect

References

German inventions
Carburettors
Engine fuel system technology
Engine components